Ceraukste Parish is an administrative unit of Bauska Municipality in the Semigallia region of Latvia.

References

Parishes of Latvia
Bauska Municipality
Semigallia